South Avenue is a short extension of Ayala Avenue north of Metropolitan Avenue in Makati, Metro Manila, Philippines. Since 2017, it carries one-way northbound traffic, implemented as an effort to decongest traffic in and out of the Makati Central Business District. It has a short extension into Barangay Olympia and Circuit Makati (formerly the Santa Ana Race Track) as Taliba Street. It is also the location of the Ecoville Townhouses and F. Benitez Elementary School.

The avenue originated from an old road linking J.P. Rizal, Makati's main road, to the Manila South Cemetery and eventually to McKinley–Pasay Road near the Nielson Field (now occupied by the Makati Central Business District). The origin of the name of the avenue is unclear, but it may be derived from the cemetery through which it passes.

See also
 Ayala Avenue
 Manila South Cemetery

References

Streets in Metro Manila
Makati